Yang Baohua (born September 1947) is a former Chinese politician from Hunan province. He served successively as the party chief of Yueyang, party chief of Changsha, and Vice-Chairman of Hunan People's Political Consultative Conference. He underwent investigation for corruption in 2014.

Biography
Yang was born in a village in Hengshan County, Hunan province, prior to the founding of the People's Republic of China. During the Cultural Revolution, Yang attended the No.1 Hengdong High School.

He became joined the workforce in December 1968 and joined the Chinese Communist Party in August 1972.

From 1968 to 1983, Yang worked as a local officer in Hengyang.

He entered Central Party School of the Chinese Communist Party in September 1983, where he graduated in August 1985. After graduation, he was appointed as the Vice-Mayor of Hengyang, a position he held until November 1991, when he was transferred to Yiyang and appointed the deputy party chief.

He served as the party chief of Yueyang between April 1995 to January 1998.

In February 1998, he was promoted to become the Communist Party Secretary of Changsha, capital of Hunan province.

In January 2003, he was elevated to the Vice-Chairman of Hunan People's Political Consultative Conference.

On May 26, 2014, it was announced that Yang was under investigation by the Central Commission for Discipline Inspection for "serious violations of laws and regulations". The CCDI investigation concluded that Yang had taken bribes, abused his power, and "committed adultery." His case was taken up by the Guilin Intermediate People's Court in Guangxi. The court found that Yang took 13.56 million yuan (~$2.13 million) in bribes personally or through his wife, son, and brother-in-law.

On November 3, 2015, Yang Baohua was sentenced to 11 years in jail for taking bribes.

References 

1947 births
Living people
People's Republic of China politicians from Hunan
Political office-holders in Hunan
Expelled members of the Chinese Communist Party
Chinese politicians convicted of corruption
Chinese Communist Party politicians from Hunan
People from Hengshan County
Politicians from Hengyang